Christie Allen (born June Dorothy Allen; 24 July 195412 August 2008) was an English-born Australian pop singer who had a successful career in Australia. Her top four hits on the Australian Kent Music Report Singles Chart were "Goosebumps" (October 1979) and "He's My Number One" (February 1980). Allen was voted the Most Popular Female Performer at the TV Week / Countdown Music Awards for 1979 and 1980. At the 1979 awards, "Goosebumps" also won the Best Songwriter award for Terry Britten. Allen died on 12 August 2008 of pancreatic cancer, aged 54.

Biography
Christie Allen was born June Dorothy Allen on 24 July 1954 in Romford, England to Keith Frederick Allen (1932-2004) and Vera Helen née Kettle (1932-2001). Allen has three brothers, Keith, Stephen and Mark. At the age of eight years, Allen sang "My Johnny's Gone Away" in a talent quest. In 1965, the Allen family migrated to Australia and settled in Perth. Allen and her brothers formed a band, Pendulum, where she provided lead vocals.

Whilst performing with Pendulum, Allen contacted UK-born Terry Britten, a songwriter and record producer and was the lead guitarist of Australian rock group, the Twilights, Britten had worked with Cliff Richard for whom he co-wrote "Devil Woman" in 1976 with Kristine Holmes. By the mid 1970s, Britten was living in Australia and was impressed by Allen's vocal ability and bubbly personality and began songwriting for her. In 1978, Allen signed a recording contract with Mushroom Records and in September 1978 she released her debut single "You Know That I Love You", which reached the top 100 on the Australian Kent Music Report Singles Chart, and attracted some national radio airplay and positive reviews.

Her next three singles from her debut album, Magic Rhythm (November 1979), were top 20 hits; "Falling in Love with Only You" reached No. 20 in April 1979. while her next two singles were strongly influenced by the popular disco style of music at the time."Goosebumps", which reached No. 3 in September 1979, and "He's My Number One", which peaked at No. 4 in February 1980. "Goosebumps" achieved sales of more than 60,000.

Allen toured Australia backed by The Hot Band, which was composed of Max Chazan on guitar (Rubes), Greg Cook on guitar (ex-Cam-Pact, the Mixtures, Ram Band, Mondo Rock), Bruce Haymes on organ (Rubes, Richard Clapton Band), Michael Hegerty on bass guitar (Richard Clapton Band), and Rick Puchala on drums (Richard Clapton Band); and later Yuri Worontschak on keyboards: Yamaha CP70B and Minimoog (ex Spitfire).

Allen was voted the 'Most Popular Female Performer' at the TV Week / Countdown Music Awards for 1979 and 1980. At the 1979 awards ceremony on 13 April 1980, Allen performed, "He's My Number One". At the same ceremony, Britten won the 'Best Songwriter' award for "He's My Number One". Allen won the 1980 award for 'Most Popular Female Performer', broadcast on 22 March 1981.

Besides performing, Allen also appeared on Countdown as a guest host in November 1979 with Russell Hitchcock (Air Supply), and in April 1980 with Molly Meldrum. In the early 1980s Allen supplied the voice-over and sang the jingle 'Come Tarino with Me' for Tarino orange soft drink commercials.

In August 1980, Allen released the singles "Baby Get Away", "Switchboard" and "Don't Put Out the Flame" and her second and final studio album Detour. By the mid-1980s a long illness prevented Allen from adequately promoting her career and she subsequently retired.

Allen and her second husband, Angelo, had a daughter Christaleah. In the 1990s Allen returned to performing as a vocalist, with country music bands. In October 1998 Allen married her partner, Marc, and at that time Michael Gudinski appealed on national radio for information on Allen's whereabouts—Gudinski wanted her to perform at a televised tribute concert for the 25th anniversary of his company, Mushroom Records. On 14 November 1998 Allen sang "Goosebumps" before a huge crowd at the Melbourne Cricket Ground—she retired following her performance which was released on the VHS album, Mushroom 25 Live (December 1998).

In 2006, Gudinski asked Allen to participate in the Countdown Spectacular tour; however, due to ill health, she declined. In March 2008 Allen was diagnosed with pancreatic cancer and died at her home in rural Western Australia on 12 August 2008, aged 54.

Personal life
Allen had an older brother, Keith, and two younger brothers, Stephen and Mark. With all three brothers, she formed a Perth-based group, Pendulum.
In the 1970s, Allen lived with her first husband, Frank Rechichi in Karratha, Western Australia.
By the 1990s, with Mark, her domestic partner, Allen had a daughter. In October 1998, Allen married her partner, Mark.

Discography

Albums

Singles

Award and nominations

TV Week / Countdown Awards
Countdown was an Australian pop music TV series on national broadcaster ABC-TV from 1974 to 1987, it presented music awards from 1979 to 1987, initially in conjunction with magazine TV Week. The TV Week / Countdown Awards were a combination of popular-voted and peer-voted awards.

|-
| rowspan="4" |1979
| rowspan="2" | herself
| Best New Talent 
| 
|-
| Most Popular Female Performer
| 
|-
| "Goosebumps"
| Most Popular Single
| 
|-
| Terry Britten for "He's My Number One" by Christie Allen
| Best Recorded Songwriter
| 
|-
| 1980
| herself
| Most Popular Female Performer
| 
|-

References

1954 births
2008 deaths
Australian country singers
Australian women pop singers
English emigrants to Australia
Naturalised citizens of Australia
Australian disco musicians
Australian dance musicians
Musicians from Perth, Western Australia
Deaths from pancreatic cancer
Deaths from cancer in Western Australia
20th-century Australian women singers
Mushroom Records artists